Fiberforge was a privately held company, started in 1998. The company uses a proprietary process for making thermoplastic advanced composites to make things more lightweight. Particular interest has been placed on decreasing weight of everyday means of transportation like cars and aircraft for better fuel efficiency and hence Environmental sustainability. Amory Lovins was its chairman emeritus.

Fiberforge ceased operations in June 2013 due to financial problems and attempted to liquidate its assets for the benefit of creditors  It was later acquired by Dieffenbacher.

History 
 1994: Rocky Mountain Institute founded the Hypercar Center to help prove its technical feasibility and commercial reality.
 1998: Rocky Mountain Institute took this process a step further by launching a for-profit venture, Hypercar Inc.
 2004: Hypercar Inc. changed its name to Fiberforge to better reflect the company's new goal of lowering the cost of high-volume advanced-composite structures/
 2010: Office is established in Zug Switzerland.
 2012: At the height of production, output with approximately 70 employees.
 2013: Ceases operations due to financial problems. Acquired by Dieffenbacher.

See also

 Amory Lovins
 Hypercar
 Rocky Mountain Institute

References

External links
 
 
 
 

Manufacturing companies based in Colorado